The V4 Ladies Series is series of an annual professional road bicycle races for women in Hungary.

Winners – V4 Ladies Series - Pannonhalma

Winners – V4 Ladies Series - Restart Zalaegerszeg

References

Cycle races in Hungary
Recurring sporting events established in 2019
Women's road bicycle races